The second Guildford Borough Council full-council elections were held on 6 May 1976.  The Conservatives retained control of the council with an increased majority, winning 35 of the 45 seats.

When Guildford Borough Council was created under the Local Government Act 1972 the electoral wards used were largely based on the wards and parish boundaries which had existed under the two previous councils - Guildford Municipal Borough Council (the town council) and Guildford Rural District Council, which together had been merged to form the new Guildford Borough Council.

There had been a slight degree of rewarding in the run up to the 1973 council election. For example, the pre 1973 Friary ward and pre 1973 St Nicolas ward were merged into a new Friary & St Nicolas ward.

Complete rewarding though would only be completed in time for the 1976 elections. The main changes to the electoral wards in the run up to the 1976 elections were as follows -

Ash ward (5 councillors) was split into two wards Ash (3 councillors) plus Ash Vale (2 councillors);

A new Christchurch ward (2 councillors) was created from part of the Stoke ward and part of the Merrow & Burpham ward;

As a result of this Merrow & Burpham ward reduced from 5 councillors to 3.  However the geographically reduced Stoke ward still retained its 3 councillors;

Artington, Compton, Puttenham, Seale and Tongham, Shackleford and Wanborough ward (2 councillors) was split into two wards Tongham (1 councillor), plus Pilgrims (2 councillors).  This represented a gain of one councillor for this area;

Stoughton saw the number of councillors represent it increase from 2 to 3;

Worplesdon also saw the number of councillors represent it increase from 2 to 3;

Albury, Shere and St Martha's ward (2 councillors) was renamed Tillingbourne (2 councillors);

East Clandon, West Clandon, East Horsley and West Horsley ward (3 councillors) was renamed Clandon and Horsley (3 councillors); and

Ripley, Wisley and Ockham ward (1 councillor) was renamed Lovelace (1 councillor).

In the 1976 election the Liberals lost three seats reducing their representation from 5 to 2.  They lost one councillor in Clandon & Horsley (previously called East Clandon, West Clandon, East Horsley and West Horsley).  They lost 2 of their 3 councillors in Friary & St Nicolas.

Labour retained all 6 councillors in its two strongholds Stoke and Westborough.

The Conservatives increased their number of councillors from 29 to 35, a figure which up to and including 2011 still remained a record for any party in a full Guildford Borough Council election.

The Conservatives 6 gains included 3 gains from the Liberals - 2 in Friary & St Nicolas and 1 in Clandon & Horsley.  The Conservatives gained 1 seat from an Independent in Tillingbourne (previously known as Aldbury, Shere and St Martha's) and made 2 gains as a result of an increase in the number of councillors representing the Stoughton and Worplesdon wards.

A total of 2 independents were elected.  Independents lost one councillor in Tillingbourne, but gained one in the new Tongham ward where the elected candidate was described as an Independent Conservative.  That Independent Conservative then went on to stand at the next full council election, in 1979, as the official Conservative candidate for the Tongham ward.

Results

References

1976
1976 English local elections
1970s in Surrey
May 1976 events in the United Kingdom